Timothy Trevor West (8 May 1938 – 30 October 2012) was an Irish mathematician, academic and politician.

Biography
He was born on 8 May 1938 in County Cork, the eldest of four sons of Timothy Roberts West, headmaster of Midleton College, and Dorothy Trevor West (née McNeill).

He was educated at Midleton College, and The High School, Dublin. West was a graduate of Trinity College Dublin (TCD), where he was elected a scholar, and of the University of Cambridge. In 1970 he was elected a Fellow of Trinity College Dublin and was also an associate professor of Mathematics, Junior Dean, and a great supporter of sport at Trinity. He was also a Member of the Royal Irish Academy. He subsequently was a Senior Fellow of TCD.

On 19 November 1970, West was elected to Seanad Éireann, at a by-election for the Dublin University constituency caused by the death of Owen Sheehy-Skeffington. After his election, he established a reputation as one of the few liberal voices in the Seanad. He was re-elected to the Seanad in 1973 and 1977, lost his seat at the 1981 Seanad election but was re-elected in 1982, then lost his seat again at the 1983 Seanad election.

With John T. Lewis and D. McQuillan, West drew up the constitution of the Irish Mathematical Society. 

He was the author of The Bold Collegians, a history of sport in Trinity College, and was an avid follower of Trinity College's sports programs. He also wrote a history of Midleton College, published for its tercentenary in 1996.

Memorials
An event was held in his memory at the Royal Irish Academy in December 2013 where a memorial issue of the Mathematical Proceedings of the Royal Irish Academy was presented.

A book of essays celebrating his life, Trevor West : The Bold Collegian, was published in October 2016.

On 14 September 2018, a new sports hall in Midleton College dedicated to the memory of Trevor West was opened by the Provost of Trinity College, Patrick Prendergast.

Publications
Trevor West, with Rien Kaashoek, Locally compact semi-algebras : with applications to spectral theory of positive operators (Amsterdam; London: North-Holland Publishing Co., 1974)
Trevor West, The Bold Collegians. The Development of Sport in Trinity College, Dublin (Dublin, 1991)
Trevor West, Midleton College, 1696–1996: A Tercentenary History (Midleton: Midleton College, 1996)

Further reading
 Maura Lee West, ed., Trevor West: the Bold Collegian (The Lilliput Press, 2016), with contributions by Sean D. Barrett, Paul Colton, Paul Coulson, Cathy Doyle, Roy Garland, Michael Halliday, Finbarr Holland, Mary Henry, Gary Hufbauer, John Kelly, Andrew Bonar Law, John McCarthy, Iggy McGovern, Hugo MacNeill, Tom Mitchell, Michael Mortell, Ulick O'Connor, Mary Robinson, Cyril Smith, Richard M. Timoney, John Tyrrell, John West, Michael West, and Charles Woodhouse.

References

External links
 

1938 births
2012 deaths
Academics of Trinity College Dublin
Alumni of Trinity College Dublin
Fellows of Trinity College Dublin
Independent members of Seanad Éireann
20th-century Irish mathematicians
Members of the Royal Irish Academy
Members of Seanad Éireann for Dublin University
Members of the 12th Seanad
Members of the 13th Seanad
Members of the 14th Seanad
Members of the 16th Seanad
People educated at Midleton College
People from County Cork
Scholars of Trinity College Dublin
Alumni of St John's College, Cambridge